Magomed Magomedov (born December 25, 1991) is a Russian mixed martial artist who competes in Bantamweight division of Bellator MMA. As of February 1, 2022, he is #4 in the Bellator Bantamweight Rankings.

Background
Magomed was born in the city of Khasavyurt, in the south of Dagestan. He went to one of the schools in Makhachkala, but rarely went to his classes, preferring to skip them with his peers. To make sure his parents didn't suspect anything, he put marks in his diary for the main subjects and forged the teachers' signatures. One day, father went unannouced to the school and found out that his 14-year-old son had not been there for 4 months.

The punishment was severe, but at the same time fateful for Magomedov. He was enrolled in the sports boarding school "Five Sides of the World", where he began to study martial disciplines, and did not have the opportunity to skip classes. The first month and a half passed very hard, but gradually Magomed began to get used to it. Here he met Zabit Magomedsharipov, who inspired him to study Wushu Sanda.

For a long time, "Tiger" could not get into the tournament for the regional level, and he did not even dream about competing on the national level. Nevertheless, training with more experienced partners under the guidance of Alexander Buryak, he began to gradually get in shape and show himself better in competitions. By 2011, Magomed completely retrained in mixed martial arts, since many of his acquaintances and friends began to build their careers in this sport. Speaking at the national championship in MMA, and after - in Europe, as an amateur champion, he migrated to professionals.

Mixed martial arts career

Early career 
It all started with M-1 Ukraine, where the Dagestan athlete smashed Ivan Prokopenko. The successful debut was followed by performances on events Legion Fight 10, SRPO Federation of Mixed Combat: Ultimatum 1, Pride of Caucasus and Pro FC 45: Thunder in Grozny, which brought victories over compatriots Garun Dibirov, Agil Ragimov, Kutmanbek Ashirov and Yakub Tangiev.

The result allowed him to move to M-1 Challenge and make a name in the company of prominent colleagues from Russia and abroad. Within a couple of years, the athlete from Dagestan gained a reputation of an unbeatable fighter in fights with representatives of different nationalities. He won by unanimous decision of judges against Damian Stasiak of Poland and Paata Robakidze of Georgia. His bout with Yuri Maia of Brazil ended with a technical knockout and Anton Vasiliev of Ukraine suffered a painful hold.

Absolute Championship Berkut 
During the year, he got four more wins and moved to the ACB league, where he was waiting for great success and serious media growth. In his debut, he managed to defeat Arthur Kashcheev by technical knockout at ACB 18, then dismantled the Brazilian Bruno Diaz in a difficult fight at ACB 24.

The leadership of the organization appreciated the young prospect, giving him the opportunity to fight for the champion title, which was then owned by Petr Yan. Their fight was held in Moscow on 26 March 2016 in Moscow at ACB 32, and it lasted all 5 rounds, since neither of the participants planned to retreat. Even the judges could not unanimously determine the winner, but still gave the split decision to Magomedov. Many did not agree with this verdict, however, many felt that Yan had won the fight, including ACB president, Mairbek Khasiev who promised to book a rematch. This fight was voted as ACB's best fight of the year in 2016.

Having rested for 9 months, "Tiger" went to the first defense at ACB 50, catching Oleg Borisov on the guillotine just 10 seconds before the end of the duel. At the same time, Petr Yan deserved a chance to challenge the title again facing off again on 15 April at ACB 57 in Moscow, but this time Yan managed to perform more convincingly, beating Magomedov by unaniumous decision. In the summer of 2017, Magomedov returned and defeated Dean Garnett at ACB 67, and in 2018, he performed twice, dismantling Edgars Skrivers at ACB 83 and Walter Pereira at ACB 90.

Bellator MMA
On October 14, 2020, it was announced that Magomedov signed with Bellator MMA.

In his promotional debut, Magomedov faced Matheus Mattos on December 10, 2020, at Bellator 254. He won the bout via unanimous decision.

Magomedov was scheduled to face Jared Scoggins on April 2, 2021, at Bellator 255. However, Scoggins pulled out of the bout due to undisclosed reasons. He was replaced by Cee Jay Hamilton. He won the fight via rear-naked choke submission in the second round.

Magomedov was scheduled to face Raufeon Stots on July 31, 2021, at Bellator 263. On July 19, it was announced that the bout was scratched from the event. It was rescheduled for Bellator 264 on August 13, 2021. He lost the bout via unanimous decision.

Bellator Bantamweight World Grand Prix
Magomedov faced Enrique Barzola in the quarter-finals of the Bellator Bantamweight World Grand Prix at Bellator 282 on June 24, 2022. He won the bout via guillotine choke in the fourth round.

In the semi-finals, Magomedov faced former Bellator Bantamweight World Championship challenger Patchy Mix on December 9, 2022, at Bellator 289. He lost the bout via second round technical submission.

Championships and accomplishments
Absolute Championship Berkut
ACB Bantamweight Championship (One time)
One successful title defense

Mixed martial arts record

|-
|Loss
|align=center|19–3
|Patchy Mix
|Technical Submission (guillotine choke)
|Bellator 289
|
|align=center|2
|align=center|2:39
|Uncasville, Connecticut, United States
|
|-
|Win
|align=center|19–2
|Enrique Barzola
|Submission (guillotine choke)
|Bellator 282
|
|align=center|4
|align=center|1:27
|Uncasville, Connecticut, United States
|
|-
|Loss
|align=center|18–2
|Raufeon Stots
|Decision (unanimous)
|Bellator 264
|
|align=center|3
|align=center|5:00
|Uncasville, Connecticut, United States
|
|-
|Win
|align=center|18–1
|Cee Jay Hamilton
|Submission (rear-naked choke)
|Bellator 255
|
|align=center|2
|align=center|1:22
|Uncasville, Connecticut, United States
|
|-
|Win
|align=center|17–1
|Matheus Mattos
|Decision (unanimous)
|Bellator 254
|
|align=center|3
|align=center|5:00
|Uncasville, Connecticut, United States
|
|-
|Win
|align=center|16–1
|Walter Pereira Jr.
|Submission (guillotine choke)
|ACB 90
|
|align=center|1
|align=center|4:41
|Moscow, Russia
|
|-
|Win
|align=center|15–1
|Edgar Skriver
|Decision (unanimous)
|ACB 83
|
|align=center|3
|align=center|5:00
|Baku, Azerbaijan
|
|-
|Win
|align=center|14–1
|Dean Garnett
|Submission (guillotine choke)
|ACB 67
|
|align=center|1
|align=center|4:09
|Grozny, Russia
| 
|-
|Loss
|align=center|13–1
|Petr Yan
|Decision (unanimous)
|ACB 57
|
|align=center|5
|align=center|5:00
|Moscow, Russia
|
|-
|Win
|align=center|13–0
|Oleg Borisov
|Submission (guillotine choke)
|ACB 50
|
|align=center|4
|align=center|4:50
|St. Petersburg, Russia
|
|-
|Win
|align=center|12–0
|Petr Yan
|Decision (split)
|ACB 32
|
|align=center|5
|align=center|5:00
|Moscow, Russia
|
|-
|Win
|align=center|11–0
|Bruno Dias
|Decision (unanimous)
|ACB 24
|
|align=center|3
|align=center|5:00
|Moscow, Russia
| 
|-
|Win
|align=center|10–0
|Artur Kascheev
|TKO (punches)
|ACB 18
|
|align=center|1
|align=center|2:31
|Grozny, Russia
|
|-
|Win
|align=center|9–0
|Paata Robakidze
|Decision (unanimous)
|M-1 Challenge 48
|
|align=center|3
|align=center|5:00
|Astana, Kazakhstan
|
|-
|Win
|align=center|8–0
|Yuri Maia
|TKO (punches)
|M-1 Challenge 44
|
|align=center|3
|align=center|2:12
|Tula, Russia
|
|-
| Win
| align=center|7–0
| Anton Vasiliev
| Submission (armbar)
| M-1 Challenge 40
| 
| align=center|1
| align=center|2:25
|Dzheyrakh, Russia
|
|-
| Win
| align=center|6–0
| Damian Stasiak
| Decision (unanimous)
| M-1 Challenge 37
| 
| align=center| 3
| align=center| 5:00
| Orenburg, Russia
|  
|-
| Win
| align=center|5–0
|Yakub Tangiev
|KO (punch)
|ProFC 45
|
|align=center|1
|align=center|2:35
|Grozny, Russia
|
|-
| Win
| align=center| 4–0
| Kutmanbek Ashirov
| TKO (punches)
| Pride Of Caucasus 2012
| 
|align=center|2
|align=center|2:35
|Khasavyurt, Russia
|
|-
| Win
| align=center| 3–0
| Agil Ragimov
| Submission (rear-naked choke)
| Ultimatum MMA 1
| 
| align=center|2
| align=center|1:45
|Saratov, Russia
| 
|-
| Win
| align=center| 2–0
| Garun Dibirov
| Submission (armbar)
| Legion Fight 10
| 
| align=center|1
| align=center|2:25
|Salsk, Russia
|
|-
| Win
| align=center| 1–0
| Ivan Prokopenko
| Submission (guillotine choke)
| M-1: International Club Grand Prix
| 
| align=center|1
| align=center|1:27
| Kiev, Ukraine
|

See also 

 List of current Bellator fighters
 List of male mixed martial artists

References

External links 
  
  

1991 births
Living people
Russian male mixed martial artists
Bantamweight mixed martial artists
Bellator male fighters